Straight Line is a 1967 Soviet drama film directed by Yuri Shvyryov.

Plot 
The film tells about the young physicist Belov, who works in the field of atomic tests at a secret research institute. He successfully submits his project, but suddenly two soldiers die at the training ground, and Belov is forced to go to the training ground to understand the reason for their death...

Cast 
 Lyudmila Dolgorukova as Natasha
 Oleg Efremov as Colonel
 Sergei Gololobov as Kostya Knyazegradski
 Evgeniy Lebedev as Neslezkin (as Yevgeni Lebedev)
 Elza Lezhdey as Emma
 Aleksey Mironov
 Rodion Nahapetov as Volodya Belov (as Rodion Nakhapetov)
 Sofiya Pilyavskaya as Zorich
 Yuriy Puzyryov as Pyotr Yakovlevich
 Lyubov Sokolova as Khudyekova

References

External links 
 

1967 films
1960s Russian-language films
Soviet drama films
1967 drama films